The 2011 World Junior Figure Skating Championships was an international figure skating competition during the 2010–11 season. Commonly called "World Juniors" and "Junior Worlds", the event crowned the World Junior Champions in the disciplines of men's singles, ladies' singles, pair skating, and ice dancing.

The event took place in Gangneung, South Korea from 28 February to 6 March 2011. It was a qualification event for the figure skating events at the 2012 Winter Youth Olympics.

Qualification
The competition was open to skaters from ISU Member Nations who were at least 13 but not 19—or 21 for male pair skaters and ice dancers—before July 1, 2010, in their place of birth. National associations selected their entries according to their own criteria.

The term "Junior" in ISU competition refers to age, not skill level. Skaters may remain age-eligible for Junior Worlds even after competing nationally and internationally at the senior level. At junior events, the ISU requires that all programs conform to junior-specific rules regarding program length, jumping passes, types of elements, etc.

Number of entries per discipline
Based on the results of the 2010 World Junior Championships, the ISU allowed each country one to three entries per discipline. Countries which qualified more than one entry in a discipline:

If not listed above, one entry was allowed.
 Kazakhstan declined second spot in men's singles competition.
 China declined two spots in the pairs competition.
 Japan declined two spots in the pairs competition.
 Italy declined second spot in the ice dance competition.

Entries
201 athletes from 48 countries participated in this edition.

Overview
China's Sui Wenjing / Han Cong won the pairs' title for the second year in a row. Switching their 2010 placements, Russia's Ksenia Stolbova / Fedor Klimov took the silver medal and Japan's Narumi Takahashi / Mervin Tran the bronze.

Andrei Rogozine became the first Canadian men's skater to win the World Junior title since 1978. Japan's Keiji Tanaka took the silver medal and Alexander Majorov took the bronze, becoming the first Swedish men's skater to step on the podium at Junior Worlds.

Bronze medalists in 2010, Ksenia Monko / Kirill Khaliavin of Russia won gold in 2011. The silver went to another Russian team, Ekaterina Pushkash / Jonathan Guerreiro, and bronze to Americans Charlotte Lichtman / Dean Copely.

In the ladies' event, Adelina Sotnikova and Elizaveta Tuktamysheva won gold and silver for Russia and American Agnes Zawadzki took the bronze medal.

Results

Men

Ladies

Pairs

Ice dancing

Medals summary

Medalists
Medals for overall placement:

Small medals for placement in the short segment:

Small medals for placement in the free segment:

By country
Table of medals for overall placement:

Table of small medals for placement in the short segment:

Table of small medals for placement in the free segment:

Prize money

References

External links
 ISU Calendar of Events
 Entries
 Starting order & Results

World Junior
World Junior Figure Skating Championships
Sports competitions in Gangneung
World Junior 2011